Committee for State Security may refer to:
 KGB, aka. Committee for State Security, the secret service of the Soviet Union from 1954 to 1991
 Committee for State Security (Bulgaria), the former secret service of the People's Republic of Bulgaria
 Committee for State Security (Ukraine), the former secret service of the Ukrainian Soviet Socialist Republic

See also 

 State Security (disambiguation)